The Taliban maintained a prison in Mazari Sharif. Several Guantanamo captives testified that they had been held in a prison in Mazari Sharif. Some of them testified that they had been tortured by the Taliban at the prison in Mazari Sharif.

Individuals who claimed the Taliban held them at its prison in Mazari Sharif

See also 
 List of prisons in Afghanistan

References